Prillimäe is a small borough in Kohila Parish, Rapla County, northern Estonia. It has a population of 375 (as of 1 October 2008) and an area of 58 ha.

References

Boroughs and small boroughs in Estonia
Kohila Parish